Anne Elizabeth Redgate or A. E. Redgate was born in Lancashire and educated at Bolton School Girls Division and St. Anne's College, Oxford. Since completing her education, she has taught Early Medieval History as a lecturer at the Newcastle University.  Her book The Armenians covers the entire eventful career of the Armenian people occupying the most south-easterly outpost of Europe from their still-mysterious origins around 1165 BC until present day.

Works  
 
Myth and Reality: Armenian Identity in the Early Middle Ages. National Identities 2007.
The Armenians, Greek translation. Athens: Odisseas, 2006.
National Letters, Vernacular Christianity and National Identity in Early Medieval Armenia. In: International Conference dedicated to the 1600th Anniversary of the Armenian Letters Creation 2005, Yerevan, Armenia: National Academy of Sciences of Armenia
Armenian Iran in the history of Vaspurakan in the late ninth and early tenth centuries. In: The Armenian Communities of Iran 2004, University of California, Los Angeles

References

External links 
The Armenians By Ms Anne Elizabeth Redgate

British medievalists
Women medievalists
Year of birth missing (living people)
Living people
Armenian studies scholars
People from Bolton
Academics of Newcastle University
British women historians